Starksia lepicoelia, known commonly as the blackcheek blenny, is a species of labrisomid blenny native to the Caribbean Sea and adjacent Atlantic Ocean. This species can reach a length of  TL.

References

lepicoelia
Fish described in 1961
Taxa named by Victor G. Springer
Taxa named by James Erwin Böhlke